Walter Leslie "Whitey" Farrant (August 12, 1912 – October 2, 1977) was a Canadian professional ice hockey right winger who played in one National Hockey League game for the Chicago Black Hawks during the 1943–44 NHL season.

See also
List of players who played only one game in the NHL

External links

1912 births
1977 deaths
Canadian ice hockey right wingers
Chicago Blackhawks players
Ice hockey people from Toronto
New Haven Eagles players
Providence Reds players
Rochester Cardinals players
Springfield Indians players
Toronto Marlboros players
Tulsa Oilers (AHA) players
Canadian expatriate ice hockey players in the United States